Charles W. Anderson Jr. (May 26, 1907 –→ June 14, 1960) was a lawyer, state legislator and civil rights leader in Kentucky. He served in the Kentucky House of Representatives from 1935 until 1946.

Biography 

Anderson was born May 26, 1907 in Louisville, Kentucky to Dr. Charles W. Anderson and Tabitha Murphy Anderson. His father was a doctor and his mother a schoolteacher.
He attended Kentucky State College (now Kentucky State University) and graduated from Wilberforce University in Ohio before moving to Washington, D.C to obtain his law degree from Howard University School of Law.

He returned to Kentucky and was admitted to the bar February 1932. He then started his own law practice in Louisville. Around this time he became president of the National Association for the Advancement of Colored People.

In April 1935 he decided to run for a seat in the Kentucky House representing the fifty-eighth district.
He was a Republican and ran against four democrats Charles E. Tucker, Rev. Ernest Grundy, Dr. Richard P. Beckman and James D. Bailey.

Anderson won the seat and was the only Republican to be elected to represent Jefferson County that session, a first for many years.
Anderson was the first African-American to be elected into the Kentucky legislature. He went on to serve six two-year sessions in total from 1935 until 1946.

He worked to pass legislation outlawing public hanging in Kentucky and to provide state aid for African Americans seeking higher degrees out-of-state due to Kentucky segregation laws.
While he was a representative he was one of several African-American lawyers to appeal against the hanging of Rainey Bethea who was the was the last person publicly executed in the United States, but on August 10, 1936 he announced that all appeals had been exhausted.

He served as president of the National Negro Bar Association for two terms starting in 1943. U.S. President Dwight D. Eisenhower appointed him an alternate delegate to the United Nations in the 1950s, and he served as the president of Louisville's NAACP branch.

Anderson resigned from his seat in the house in 1946 to become the Assistant Commonwealth Attorney for Jefferson County, another first for an African-American in Kentucky. Three years later in 1949 he was nominated for the position of judge for the third municipal district, but was narrowly defeated at the election.

He had two children with his second wife. His half-sister Florence was an educator.

Death 
Anderson was killed June 14, 1960 when his car was hit by a train at a crossing in Shelby County. He was buried at Eastern Cemetery. There is a historical marker in Louisville (No. 1964) marking his as the first African American elected in the state.

References

External links
 

1907 births
1960 deaths
People from Louisville, Kentucky
Howard University School of Law alumni
Wilberforce University alumni
Members of the Kentucky House of Representatives
African-American activists
African-American lawyers
NAACP activists
African-American state legislators in Kentucky
20th-century American lawyers
20th-century African-American politicians
20th-century American politicians
African-American men in politics
Accidental deaths in Kentucky
Burials in Kentucky
Railway accident deaths in the United States